Aaron Owen Phillips (born 20 November 1993) is an English footballer who plays as a defender for  club St Ives Town. He has played in the English Football League for Coventry City and Northampton Town.

Career

Coventry City
On 31 January 2013, Phillips joined Conference Premier club Nuneaton Town on loan for a month, with a view of gaining more experience, He made his Nuneaton Town debut on 2 February 2013 in a 3–2 loss to Stockport County. Phillips was joined at Nuneaton by fellow Sky Blue Lee Burge, both Phillips and Burge had their loan spells extended until the end of the season and were influential in saving Nuneaton from relegation.

Phillips made his Coventry City debut as a substitute on 3 August 2013 in a 3–2 League One loss to Crawley Town, coming on to replace Jordan Willis after 82 minutes. Phillips scored his first goal for the club on 19 October in a 1–1 draw against Wolverhampton Wanderers. Aaron made his first start for Coventry City in their 1–0 victory in League One against Walsall in October 2013.

On 1 January 2014, Phillips signed a new contract to keep him at Coventry City until the summer of 2016.

Northampton Town
On 3 June 2016, Phillips signed for Northampton Town newly promoted to League One. He made his league debut for Northampton on 6 August 2016 in a 1–1 home draw against Flettwood Town. He scored his first goal for Northampton on 14 March 2017 in a 2–1 home win against Port Vale. His goal came in the 63rd minute, and was assisted by John-Joe O'Toole. This was the first goal of the game.

Brackley Town 
On 28 August 2020, Phillips signed for Brackley Town for the 20/21 Season in the National League North.

Personal life
Phillips' father is former Wales international footballer David Phillips who a member of the Coventry City team that won the 1987 FA Cup Final.

Career statistics

References

External links

1993 births
Living people
People from Warwick
Footballers from Warwickshire
English footballers
English people of Welsh descent
Association football defenders
Coventry City F.C. players
Nuneaton Borough F.C. players
Northampton Town F.C. players
Kidderminster Harriers F.C. players
St Ives Town F.C. players
National League (English football) players
English Football League players
Southern Football League players